Fred J. Busse was a member of the Wisconsin State Assembly. Busse was elected to the Assembly in 1922 and 1924. Additionally, he was Town Chairman (similar to Mayor) of Mequon, Wisconsin and a member of the County Board of Ozaukee County, Wisconsin. He was a Republican.

References

Politicians from Chicago
People from Mequon, Wisconsin
County supervisors in Wisconsin
Mayors of places in Wisconsin
Year of birth missing
Year of death missing
Republican Party members of the Wisconsin State Assembly